Dentalium elephantinum, the elephant tusk, is a species of scaphopod mollusc.  Its shell is often deep green fading to white at its tip and has between eight and 17 strong ribs along its sides.  Adults are about 70 mm in length with an diameter of about 11 mm at the shell aperture.  It is native to Amboyna, the Philippine Islands, and the Red Sea.

References

Scaphopods
Molluscs described in 1758
Taxa named by Carl Linnaeus